Agnes Hildegard Sjöberg (15 November 1888 Kauhajoki - 21 August 1964 Seinäjoki) was a Finnish veterinarian. She graduated as a veterinarian and as the first woman in Europe and likely the first woman in the world to defend her PhD in veterinary medicine. During her career, Sjöberg worked as a municipal veterinarian in Somero and Närpes and held a private reception for a long time. Sjöberg was subjected to prejudice and discrimination by colleagues, and her pioneering work as a female veterinarian was not recognized until much after her death.

Biography

Early life and education 
Agnes Sjöberg's parents were Johan B. Sjöberg and Karin Norrgård.  They had an advanced model farm in Kauhajoki, which included a livestock school and strawberry plantations.  Agnes first attended school at home under the guidance of a home teacher and in 1900–1905 at the Swedish girls' school in Vaasa. She would have liked to continue as a student, but due to his father's opposition, she continued her studies at the Vaasa School of Economics. After graduating, she took care of her parents' finances for three years, after which her father bowed and let her daughter read as a student. Agnes Sjöberg graduated as a private student in 1911 from the Swedish co-educational school in Kuopio.

Veterinary studies 
As a child, Sjöberg had dreamed of becoming a veterinarian. Sge had followed the teaching of the cattle school at her home farm and got acquainted with, among other things, the anatomy of the cattle. With the help of her aunt, she was able to assist John Engdahl, Huittinen's district veterinarian, in following the work of the veterinarian. At the end of the internship, Dr. Engdahl admitted that he was prejudiced but recommended her to study in the field. On Engdahl's recommendation, Sjöberg was promised a place to study at the University of Zurich . Arriving in Switzerland, however, she was disappointed, as the university had just banned Russian citizens - that is, also Finns - from studying at the university for fear of revolutionaries.

Sjöberg received a letter of recommendation from the University of Zurich, which allowed her to begin her veterinary studies in Germany at the University of Dresden in the autumn of 1911. The female student was admitted to study on an experimental basis among 300 male students. At the same time, there were thirty other Finnish veterinary students in Dresden who were hostile to Sjöberg. Due to pressure and to get rid of other Finnish students, Sjöberg moved to the University of Berlin the following year, where there were only a few Finnish students. In 1913, Sjöberg applied to the university for permission to complete a bachelor's degree in veterinary medicine. Sjöberg's gender again caused problems, as according to university rules, only a male student could complete a degree. The matter went to the level of the ministry, and in the summer of 1913 an official decision was made that a woman student could also graduate as a veterinarian in Germany.

The outbreak of World War I in 1914 delayed Agnes's completion until the spring of 1916. During the war, however, she was able to work at the University Animal Clinic with men on the front lines. After graduating she began to work on and defend her dissertation in Leipzig 1918. The title of the dissertation was Klinische und chemisch-mikroskopische Untersuchungen des Augensekretes der Pferde.

Career in Finland 
In the same year that Sjöberg received her doctorate, she returned to Finland. She took on the position of municipal veterinarian, first in Somero in 1918–1920 and then in Närpes in 1920–1923. In 1923, she traveled abroad again to learn more, first to London, then to the United States, and finally to Germany and Austria. During her trip, she became acquainted with schools and clinics in the field, and engaged in work and further research. One result of the trip was a study on ruminant parasites. Sjöberg returned to Finland again in 1926, first opening a private veterinary practice in Kauhajoki where she operated in 1926–1932 and then in Kurikka in 1932–1935. After working as a meat inspector in Ilmajoki in 1935–1938, she eventually settled in Seinäjoki, where she had her own animal clinic in 1938–1955.

Among her clients Sjöberg had been popular, but this was not the case with many other veterinary colleagues. Early in her career, she quarreled with Rainer Stenius, long-time chairman of the Veterinary Association and advisor to the Department of Veterinary Medicine of the Ministry of Agriculture. After the Board of Honor of the Veterinary Association accused Sjöberg of uncollegial conduct, she resigned from the association, embittered.

In 1918 the Finnish news magazine Suomen Kuvalehti made the following remarks: "Her medical practice in Germany, where she has cared for even large domestic animals, horses, cows, etc., thus proves that a woman's strength is sufficient for this profession as well."Sjöberg's pioneering work as a female veterinarian was not recognized until much after her death. A street close to the Faculty of Veterinary Medicine in the Viikki district of Helsinki was named Agnes Sjöberg Street in 2001, and in her native Kauhajoki Sööpärintie is named after her.

Personal life 
Agnes Sjöberg married Veikko Klaavu in 1928. It was a short-lived marriage; she had twin sons, whom she raised alone.

Works 

 Clinical and chemical-microscopic analysis of the growth of the pens . Dissertation. 1918.
 Europe's first female veterinarian. Agnes Hildegard Sjöberg, Doctor of Veterinary Medicine. Life from childhood to silver hair. Vaasa 1964. (Visible edition: Lasipalatsi, 2000.) List of publications at the end of the work.

External links 

 Manninen, Antti: Agnes Sjöberg fought for the first female veterinarian in Europe. Helsingin Sanomat , 11 June 2007. Paid online version of the article.
 Mäkelä-Alitalo, Anneli: “Sjöberg, Agnes (1888–1964)”, Finnish National Biography  , Part 9 , pp. 82–84. Helsinki: Finnish Literary Society, 2007. . Online version of the book.

References 

Women veterinarians
1888 births
1964 deaths
Finnish veterinarians
People from Kauhajoki